The 2007–08 Atlanta Hawks season was the team's 59th season of the franchise in the National Basketball Association (NBA) and the 40th in Atlanta.  After missing the playoffs for eight straight seasons, the Hawks selected Al Horford out of the University of Florida with the third pick in the 2007 NBA draft. The Hawks started out the season by defeating the Dallas Mavericks 101–94 in their season opener, marking the first time they won their first game of the season since the 1999 lockout season. However, their struggles continued as they went on a six-game losing streak around the All-Star break. At midseason, the Hawks traded Tyronn Lue, Lorenzen Wright, Anthony Johnson, and second-year forward Shelden Williams to the Sacramento Kings for Mike Bibby. The Hawks finished third in the Southeast Division with a 37–45 record, and made the playoffs for the first time since 1999. Joe Johnson averaged 21.7 points per game, and was selected for the 2008 NBA All-Star Game. Josh Smith provided the team with 17.2 points, 8.2 rebounds, and 2.8 blocks per game, while Horford averaged 10.1 points and 9.7 rebounds per game, and made the NBA All-Rookie First Team.

In the first round of the playoffs, they lost to the top-seeded Boston Celtics in seven games. With their 37-45 (0.451) record, the 2008 Hawks are the worst team record-wise to push an eventual NBA Champion to an elimination game. Coincidentally, the Hawks in 2014 would be the 8th seed at 38-44 and take the top seeded conference finalist Indiana Pacers to a 7 game series. Following the season, Josh Childress left to play overseas.

Key dates prior to the start of the season:

The 2007 NBA draft took place in New York City on June 28.
The free agency period began in July.

Offseason

Draft picks
Atlanta's selections from the 2007 NBA draft in New York City.

Roster

Regular season

Standings

Record vs. opponents

Game log

|- bgcolor="bbffbb"
| 1 || November 2 || Dallas ||W 101–94|| J. Johnson (28) || Smith (11) || J. Johnson, Lue, Smith (4) ||Philips Arena19,767 || 1–0
|- bgcolor="edbebf"
| 2 || November 4 || @ Detroit || L 91–92 || J. Johnson (23) || Horford (11) || J. Johnson (4) ||The Palace of Auburn Hills22,076 || 1–1
|- bgcolor="edbebf"
| 3 || November 6 || @ New Jersey || W 82–87 || Childress, Smith (18) || Childress, Horford, Smith (7) || Smith (6) ||Izod Center12,336 || 1–2
|- bgcolor="bbffbb"
| 4 || November 7 || Phoenix || W 105–96 || Smith (22) || Horford (15) || J. Johnson (10) ||Philips Arena19,855 || 2–2
|- bgcolor="edbebf"
| 5 || November 9 || @ Boston || L 83–106 || J. Johnson, Horford (16) || Childress, Horford (7) || J. Johnson, Law (5) ||TD Banknorth Garden18,624 || 2–3
|- bgcolor="edbebf"
| 6 || November 11 || Washington || L 90–101 || Smith (23) || M. Williams (12) || M. Williams (6) ||Philips Arena13,172 || 2–4
|- bgcolor="bbffbb"
| 7 || November 14 || Charlotte || W 117–109 || J. Johnson (34) || Horford (13)  || J. Johnson (10) ||Philips Arena12,239 || 3–4
|- bgcolor="edbebf"
| 8 || November 16 || Seattle || L 123–126 || J. Johnson (39) || Horford (14) || J. Johnson (6) ||Philips Arena13,534 || 3–5
|- bgcolor="edbebf"
| 9 || November 17 || @ Milwaukee || L 96–105 || Smith (38) || Horford, M. Williams (8) || J. Johnson (9) ||Bradley Center14,511 || 3–6
|- bgcolor="edbebf"
| 10 || November 20 || San Antonio || L 83–95||J. Johnson (20) ||Horford (8) ||A. Johnson (7) ||Philips Arena 17,025|| 3–7
|- bgcolor="bbffbb"
| 11 || November 21 || @ Miami ||W 82–79|| J. Johnson (22) ||J. Smith (11) || J. Johnson, Josh Smith (4)||American Airlines Arena 19,600||4–7
|- bgcolor="bbffbb"
| 12 || November 24 || @ Minnesota ||W 98–87 ||J. Johnson (25)||J. Smith (8) || J. Johnson, J. Smith (5) ||Target Center 14,101||5–7
|- bgcolor="edbebf"
| 13 || November 27 || @ Chicago ||L 78–90 ||J. Johnson (21) ||A. Horford (14) ||J. Johnson (5) ||United Center21,826 ||5–8
|- bgcolor="bbffbb"
| 14 || November 28 || Milwaukee ||W 96–80 ||J. Johnson (21)||J. Smtih, Z. Pachulia (8) ||J. Smith (7) ||Philips Arena 11,286||6–8
|- bgcolor="edbebf"
| 15 || November 30 || New Orleans ||L 86–92 ||M. Williams (18) || A. Horford (15)||J. Johnson (9) ||Philips Arena 14,186||6–9
|-

|- bgcolor="bbffbb"
| 16 || December 3 || @ Philadelphia ||W 88–79 || J. Smtih (22)|| A. Horford (13)|| J. Johnson (7)||Wachovia Center 11,465
||7–9
|-bgcolor="edbebf"
| 17 || December 4 || Detroit ||L 95–106 || J. Childress (18)||A. Horford (10)||A. Johnson, S. Stoudamire (3) ||Philips Arena 12,754
||7–10
|-bgcolor="bbffbb"
| 18 || December 6 || Minnesota ||W 90–89 ||J. Smith (28) ||A. Horford (15) ||A. Johnson (6) ||Philips Arena 12,232
||8–10
|-bgcolor="bbffbb"
| 19 || December 8 || Memphis ||W 86–78 || J. Smith (25)||A. Horford (14) ||A. Johnson (8) ||Philips Arena 15,658
||9–10
|-bgcolor="bbffbb"
| 20 || December 10 || @ Orlando ||W 98–87  ||J. Smith (25) ||J. Smith (15) ||J. Smith, A. Johnson (5) ||Amway Arena 16,821
||10–10
|-bgcolor="edbebf"
| 21 || December 11 || Toronto ||L 88–100 ||J. Johnson, M. Williams (23) ||A. Horford (10) ||A. Law (6) ||Philips Arena 13,173 ||10–11
|-bgcolor="edbebf"
| 22 || December 14 || @ Detroit||L 81–91 ||J. Johnson (23)||L. Wright (12)||A. Johnson, J. Smith (3) ||The Palace of Auburn Hills 22,076||10–12
|-bgcolor="bbffbb"
| 23 || December 15 || Charlotte ||W 93–84||J. Johnson (31) ||J. Smith (10) ||A. Johnson (7) ||Philips Arena 14,040 ||11–12
|-bgcolor="bbffbb"
| 24 || December 17 || Utah ||W 116–111 ||J. Johnson (26) ||J. Smith (12) ||A. Johnson (14) ||Philips Arena 15,263||12–12
|-bgcolor="bbffbb"
| 25 || December 19 || Miami || W 114–111(OT) ||M.Williams (26) || M.Williams (9) || A.Johnson, J.Johnson (9) ||Philips Arena17,069 ||13–12
|-bgcolor="bbffbb"
| 26 || December 21 || @ Washington ||W 97–92 ||J. Johnson (32) ||J. Smith (14) ||J. Johnson, A. Johnson (8) ||Verizon Center16,472 ||14–12
|-bgcolor="bbffbb"
| 27 || December 26 || Indiana ||W 107–95 ||J. Johnson (26) ||S. Williams (10) ||J. Johnson (11) ||Philips Arena 16,070||15–12
|-bgcolor="edbebf"
| 28 || December 29 || @ Dallas ||L 84–97 ||M. Williams (18) ||A. Horford (10) ||J. Johnson (5) ||American Airlines Center 20,338||15–13
|-

|-bgcolor="edbebf"
| 29 || January 2 || @ Cleveland ||L 94–98 ||J. Johnson (24) ||A. Horford (9) ||A. Horford (3) ||Quicken Loans Arena 20,562||15–14
|-bgcolor="edbebf"
| 30 || January 4 || @ Indiana ||L 91–113 ||J. Childress (26) ||J. Childress (8) ||M. West (3) ||Conseco Fieldhouse10,797 ||15–15
|-bgcolor="edbebf"
| 31 || January 5 || New Jersey ||L 107–113 ||J. Smith (34) ||J. Smith (9) ||A. Johnson (10) ||Philips Arena      15,766||15–16
|-bgcolor="bbffbb"
| 32 || January 9 || Cleveland ||W 90–81 ||J. Johnson (29) ||A. Horford (15) ||A. Johnson (6) ||Philips Arena 16,246||16–16
|-bgcolor="edbebf"
| 33 || January 11 || Washington ||L 98–102 ||J. Smith (35) || A. Horford (19) ||A. Johnson, J. Johnson (9) ||Philips Arena 16,064||16–17
|-bgcolor="bbffbb"
| 34 || January 13 || Chicago ||W 105–84 ||J. Johnson (37) ||J. Johnson, J. Childress, A. Horford (9) ||J. Johnson (6) ||Philips Arena 16,065||17–17
|-bgcolor="bbffbb"
| 35 || January 15 || Denver ||W 104–93 ||J. Johnson (22) ||M. Williams (9) ||A. Johnson (6) ||Philips Arena 18,235||18–17
|-bgcolor="edbebf"
| 36 || January 16 || @ Milwaukee ||L 80–87 ||M. Williams (22) ||A. Horford, J. Johnson (7) ||A. Johnson (7) ||Bradley Center 14,506||18–18
|-bgcolor="edbebf"
| 37 || January 18 || @ Toronto ||L 78–89 ||J. Johnson (25) ||A. Horford, M. Williams, J. Smith (9) ||J. Smith, J. Johnson (7) ||Air Canada Centre 19,800||18–19
|-bgcolor="edbebf"
| 38 || January 21 || Portland ||L 109–111 ||J. Johnson (37) ||J. Smith (17) ||J. Johnson (7) ||Philips Arena 17,400||18–20
|-bgcolor="edbebf"
| 39 || January 23 || @ Denver ||L 100–107 ||J. Smith (22)||J. Smith (12) ||J. Smith (10) ||Pepsi Center 14,213||18–21
|-bgcolor="bbffbb"
| 40 || January 25 || @ Seattle ||W 99–90 ||M. Williams (33) ||A. Horford (16) ||J. Johnson (7)||KeyArena13,647 ||19–21
|-bgcolor="edbebf"
| 41 || January 27 || @ Portland ||L 93–94 ||J. Johnson (19) ||A. Horford (12) ||A. Johnson (11) ||Rose Garden 20,438||19–22
|-bgcolor="edbebf"
| 42 || January 29 || @ Phoenix ||L 92–125 ||M. Williams (18) ||M. Williams, J. Johnson (8) ||A. Law (4) ||US Airways Center 18,422||19–23
|-bgcolor="edbebf"
| 43 || January 30 || @ LA Clippers ||L 88–95 ||J. Smith (21) ||J. Smith, A. Horford (10) ||J. Smith (8) ||Staples Center 14,874||19–24
|-

|-bgcolor="bbffbb"
| 44 || February 2 || New Jersey ||W 104–92||M. Williams(24)||J. Smith(8)||A. Law(8)||Philips Arena18,102||20–24
|-bgcolor="bbffbb"
| 45 || February 4 || Philadelphia ||W 96–91||J. Childress(21)||A. Horford(8)||J. Smith(9)||Philips Arena14,563||21–24
|-bgcolor="bbffbb"
| 46 || February 6 || LA Lakers ||W 98–95||J. Johnson(28)||A. Horford(20)||J. Smith(9)||Philips Arena19,701||22–24
|-bgcolor="edbebf"
| 47 || February 8 || Cleveland ||L 100–95||J. Johnson(23)||J. Smith(8)||J. Johnson(8)||Philips Arena19,335||22–25
|-bgcolor="edbebf"
| 48 || February 9 || @ Houston ||L 108–89||J. Childress(21)||Z. Pachulia(9)||J. Johnson(4)||Toyota Center18,177||22–26
|-bgcolor="edbebf"
| 49 || February 12 || Detroit ||L 94–90||J. Smith(30)||A. Horford(16)||J. Johnson(4)||Philips Arena18,227||22–27
|-bgcolor="edbebf"
| 50 || February 13 || @ Charlotte ||L 100–98||J. Johnson(23)||A. Horford(14)||J. Johnson(4)||Charlotte Bobcats Arena11,213||22–28
|-bgcolor="edbebf"
| 51 || February 19 || @ LA Lakers ||L 122–93||J. Johnson(18)||Z. Pachulia(12)||J. Smith(6)||Staples Center18,997||22–29
|-bgcolor="edbebf"
| 52 || February 20 || @ Sacramento ||L 119–107||J. Childress(18)||A. Horford(12)||J. Johnson(4)||ARCO Arena13,641||22–30
|-bgcolor="bbffbb"
| 53 || February 22 || @ Golden State ||W 117–110||J. Johnson(27)||M. Williams(14)||J. Johnson(8)||Oracle Arena19,596||23–30
|-bgcolor="edbebf"
| 54 || February 23 || @ Utah ||L 100–94||J. Smith(30)||J. Smith(12)||M. BibbyJ. Johnson(9)||EnergySolutions Arena19,911||23–31
|-bgcolor="edbebf"
| 55 || February 25 || @ San Antonio ||L 89–74||J. Johnson(17)||A. HorfordJ. Smith(13)||M. BibbyJ. Johnson(5)||AT&T Center18,113||23–32
|-bgcolor="bbffbb"
| 56 || February 27 || Sacramento ||W 123–117||J. Johnson(26)||A. Horford(14)||M. Bibby(12)||Philips Arena15,661||24–32
|-bgcolor="bbffbb"
| 57 || February 29 || New York ||W 99–93||J. Smith(25)||A. Horford(11)||M. Bibby(11)||Philips Arena18,339||25–32
|-

|-bgcolor="edbebf"
| 58 || March 2 || @ Boston ||L 98–88||J. Smith(22) ||A. Horford(11)||M. Bibby(9)||TD Banknorth Garden18,624||25–33
|-bgcolor="edbebf"
| 59 || March 4 || Golden State ||L 135–118||J. Johnson(38)||J. Smith(11)||M. BibbyJ. Johnson(6)||Philips Arena16,575||25–34
|-bgcolor="edbebf"
| 60 || March 5 || @ New Orleans||L 116–101||J. Johnson(24)||A. Horford(11)||M. BibbyA. Horford(4)||New Orleans Arena12,430||25–35
|-bgcolor="edbebf"
| 61 || March 7 || @ Charlotte||L 108–93||J. Johnson(20)||A. Horford(11)||M. Bibby(10)||Charlotte Bobcats Arena15,203||25–36
|-bgcolor="bbffbb"
| 62 || March 8||Miami||W 97–94||J. Johnson(39)||J. Smith(8)||J. Johnson(8)||Philips Arena17,022||26–36
|-bgcolor="edbebf"
| 63 || March 10 || @ Orlando ||L 123–112||J. Johnson(27)||J. Smith(12)||J. Johnson(11)||Amway Arena15,921||26–37
|-bgcolor="edbebf"
| 64 || March 12 ||Houston||L 83–75||J. Johnson(28)||J. Smith(22)||M. BibbyA. Horford(4)||Philips Arena17,078||26–38
|-bgcolor="bbffbb"
| 65 || March 14 ||LA Clippers||W 117–93||J. Johnson(28)||Z. Pachulia(10)||M. Bibby(14)||Philips Arena16,107||27–38
|-bgcolor="bbffbb"
| 66 || March 16 || @ New York ||W 109–98||J. Johnson(28)||A. Horford(10)||J. Johnson(11)||Madison Square Garden19,763||28–38
|-bgcolor="bbffbb"
| 67 || March 17 || @ Washington||W 105–96||M. Bibby(23) ||A. Horford(15)||J. Johnson(10)||Verizon Center16,227 ||29–38
|-bgcolor="edbebf"
| 68 || March 19 || @ New Jersey || L 125–117||J. Johnson(24)||A. Horford(15)||M. BibbyA. Horford(6)||Izod Center14,102||29–39
|-bgcolor="bbffbb"
| 69 || March 22 || Orlando ||W 98–90||J. Johnson(34)||A. Horford(10)||M. Bibby(8)||Philips Arena18,825||30–39
|-bgcolor="edbebf"
| 70 || March 25 || @ Chicago ||L 103–94||J.Childress(22)||A. Horford(13)||M. Bibby(7)||United Center21,806||30–40
|-bgcolor="bbffbb"
| 71 || March 26 || Milwaukee ||W 115–96||J. Johnson(28)||Z. Pachulia(8)||J. Johnson(8)||Philips Arena14,832||31–40
|-bgcolor="bbffbb"
| 72 || March 28 || Chicago||W 106–103||M. Bibby(30)||M. Williams(11)||M. Bibby(8)||Philips Arena17,223||32–40
|-bgcolor="bbffbb"
| 73 || March 30 || New York ||W 114–109||M. Williams(27)||A. Horford(13)||J. Johnson(13)||Philips Arena16,573||33–40
|-bgcolor="bbffbb"
| 74 || March 31 || @ Memphis ||W 116–99 ||J. Smith (26) ||J. Smith(8) ||J. Johnson(8)||FedExForum10,281||34–40
|-

|-bgcolor="bbffbb"
| 75 || April 2 || Toronto ||W 127–120||J. Johnson(28)||A. Horford(12)||M. Bibby(12)||Philips Arena14,691||35–40
|-bgcolor="edbebf"
| 76 || April 4 || Philadelphia ||L 109–104||J.Johnson(32)||J.Smith(8)||M.Bibby(11)||Philips Arena18,729||35–41
|-bgcolor="bbffbb"
| 77 || April 5 || @ Philadelphia ||W 112–98||J.Johnson(30)||A.Horford(12)||J.Johnson(6)||Wachovia Center19,775||36–41
|-bgcolor="edbebf"
| 78 || April 8 || @ Indiana ||L 92–85||J.Johnson(22)||J.Smith(13)||J.Johnson(4)||Conseco Fieldhouse10,876||36–42
|- bgcolor="bbffbb"
| 79 || April 11 || @ New York ||W 116–104||J.Johnson(34)||A.Horford(11)|| J.Johnson(6)||Madison Square Garden19,763||37–42
|-bgcolor="edbebf"
| 80 ||April 12||Boston||L 99–89||J.Johnson(21)||A.Horford(11)||J.Johnson(8)||Philips Arena20,098||37–43
|- bgcolor="edbebf"
| 81 || April 15 || Orlando ||L 121–105 ||M. Williams(16)||A.Horford(11)||A.Horford(6)||Philips Arena18,738||37–44
|- bgcolor="edbebf"
| 82 || April 16 || @ Miami || L 113–99 ||J.Smith(20)||A.Horford(12)||M.BibbyJ.Johnson(5)||American Airlines Arena19,073 ||37–45
|-

(*)The final minute of the Miami game was played on March 8

Player stats

Regular season 

*Total for entire season including previous team(s)

Playoffs

|- bgcolor="edbebf"
| 1 || April 20 || @ Boston || 81–104 || A. Horford (20) || A. Horford (10) || J. Johnson (7) ||TD Banknorth Garden18,624 || 0–1
|- bgcolor="edbebf"
| 2 || April 23 || @ Boston || 77–96 || Two-Way Tie (13) || A. Horford (9) || Two-Way Tie (3) ||TD Banknorth Garden18,624 || 0–2
|- bgcolor="bbffbb"
| 3 || April 26 || Boston || 102–93 ||J. Smith (27)||A. Horford (10)||M. Bibby (8)||Philips Arena19,725||1–2
|- bgcolor="bbffbb"
| 4 || April 28 || Boston || 97–92 || J. Johnson (35) || A. Horford (13) || J. Johnson (6) ||Philips Arena20,016 || 2–2
|- bgcolor="edbebf"
| 5 || April 30 || @ Boston||85–110||J. Johnson (21)||A. Horford (10)||A. Horford (5)||TD Banknorth Garden18,624||2–3
|- bgcolor="bbffbb"
| 6 || May 2 || Boston || 103–100 || M. Williams (18) || Four-Way Tie (6) || M. Bibby (7) ||Philips Arena20,425 || 3–3
|- bgcolor="edbebf"
| 7 || May 4 || @ Boston || 65–99 || J. Johnson (16) || A. Horford (12) || A. Horford (3) ||TD Banknorth Garden18,624 || 3–4
|-

Awards and records
Joe Johnson, Selected to the NBA All-Star Game
Al Horford, selected to participate in the T-Mobile Rookie Challenge
Al Horford, named November Eastern Conference Rookie of the Month
Joe Johnson, named NBA Player of the Week
Al Horford, named February Eastern Conferenced Rookie of the Month
Joe Johnson named March Eastern Conference Player of the Month

Records

Milestones

Transactions
The Hawks have been involved in the following transactions during the 2007–08 season.

Trades

See also
2007–08 NBA season

References

External links

Atlanta Hawks seasons
Atlanta Hawks
Atlanta Haw
Atlanta Haw